Navinchandra Ramgoolam, GCSK, FRCP (born July 14, 1947), is a Mauritian politician who was the former Prime Minister of Mauritius from 2005 to 2014 and leader of the Labour Party (Mauritius). He was Leader of the Opposition from 1991 to 1995. He served as Prime Minister for the first time from December 1995 until September 2000, and then became Leader of the Opposition again from October 2000 to the Fourth of July 2005. On July 5, 2005, he became prime minister for a second term after his coalition, "Alliance Sociale" won the general elections. He was re-elected Prime Minister from 2005 to 2014, when he was defeated.

Early life and education
Navin Ramgoolam was born on 14 July 1947 to Seewoosagur Ramgoolam (SSR) and Sushil Ramjoorawon at their Desforges Street residence in Port Louis. SSR was the 6th Governor General of Mauritius, as well as the first Chief Minister and Prime Minister of Mauritius. In the 1800s his ancestors migrated to Mauritius from Harigaon in Bhojpur district, Bihar. Navin is married to Veena Ramgoolam. He attended the Royal College Curepipe from 1960 to 1966 and proceeded to study medicine in Ireland between 1968 and 1975, where he obtained the LRCP&SI licentiates from the Royal College of Physicians of Ireland and the Royal College of Surgeons in Ireland.

When his father SSR died in December 1985, Ramgoolam was on the point of immigrating to Canada when Sir Satcam Boolell (then leader of Labour Party) and Paul Berenger (the leader of the Mauritian Militant Movement) convinced him to return assume the leadership of the Labour party with the objective of an alliance which would defeat Anerood Jugnauth in the general elections. He subsequently served as a medical doctor at Dr A.G Jeetoo Hospital in Mauritius from 1985 to 1987. In 1987, he started his law studies at The London School of Economics and Political Science, University of London. Upon completion of his LLB degree in 1990, he returned to Mauritius to face the electorate as the new leader of the Labour party in the 1991 general election.

1991 elections and first candidacy

The leadup to the general elections held in 1991 saw a realignment of the country's major political parties. The Mauritian Militant Movement (MMM), which had been the main opposition party, decided to contest the election as an ally of Prime Minister Anerood Jugnauth's Militant Socialist Movement (MSM). Ramgoolam's Labour Party and Gaëtan Duval's Parti Mauricien Social Démocrate (PMSD), both of which had been allied with the MSM in the previous election, formed a separate alliance, along with the Rodrigues People's Organisation (OPR). A major campaign issue was the proposal of the MSM-MMM alliance to cut the country's ties with the British Monarchy and declare a republic with a President as head of state. Ramgoolam opposed this, arguing that the Presidential office would be too ceremonial, leaving all executive powers effectively in the hands of the Prime Minister.

The election turned out to be a landslide for Jugnauth. The MSM/MMM alliance won 57 of the 62 directly elected seats. Of the 5 seats won by Ramgoolam's alliance, 2 were held by the OPR and 3 by his own Labour Party (Arvin Boolell, Vasant Bunwaree and himself, being elected in constituency 5, Triolet & Pamplemoussess). Following his defeat, he took leave as Leader of the Opposition and returned to London to complete his law vocational course at Inns of Court School of Law. He was called to United Kingdom Bar, Inner Temple in 1993.

In 1993, Prime Minister Jugnauth asked the Speaker of the National Assembly to declare Ramgoolam's seat vacant as he had not attended Parliament for three consecutive moments. The Speaker referred the case to the Court but the Judge found that it was unconstitutional.

Shortly afterwards, Jugnauth dismissed Bérenger from the Cabinet after learning that Ramgoolam had hosted him at a private dinner at his Riverwalk residence. Bérenger and 10 MMM members joined Ramgoolam on the opposition benches. Although the MMM caucus was larger than the Labour Party caucus, he agreed to let Ramgoolam continue as Leader of the Opposition.

1995 elections

The Labour Party and the MMM went on to forge an alliance to contest the 1995 elections. The alliance won all 60 directly elected seats from the mainland (with Labour taking 35 seats and the MMM 25). Ramgoolam became Prime Minister with Bérenger as his Deputy. The coalition soon fractured and Ramgoolam dismissed Bérenger in 1997. Bérenger then became Leader of the Opposition, while Ramgoolam formed a one-party government.

2000 elections

Jugnauth and Bérenger formed a new alliance to contest the 2000 elections. Part of the agreement was to allow Jugnauth to serve for the first three years of the five-year term, then resign to assume the Presidency and allow Bérenger to complete his unexpired term. Ramgoolam, for his part, formed an alliance with the Mauritian Party of Xavier-Luc Duval (PMXD), a breakaway from the PMSD led by Xavier-Luc Duval, the son of Sir Gaëtan Duval. The MSM/MMM alliance won 54 of the 60 directly elected mainland seats. Ramgoolam, who had retained his own seat, became Leader of the Opposition.

2005 elections
His Alliance Social won the general elections against the MSM/MMM outgoing government. He was again appointed as prime minister with a majority of 38 out of 60 seats. His alliance also won the local/municipal elections in 2006 where the MSM/MMM was severely defeated. These consecutive defeats and internal instability caused the break-up of the MSM/MMM coalition.

As the MSM had more seats than the MMM and Pravind Jugnauth was not elected, Nando Bodha was appointed as Leader of the Opposition.

2010 elections

With the 2010 elections approaching, Ramgoolam decided in 2008 to support Jugnauth for re-election as President, to forestall a possible return by Jugnauth to parliamentary politics, where Ramgoolam viewed him as a potential threat. Jugnauth's condition for accepting the offer was an alliance between the Labour Party and the MSM. At Ramgoolam's insistence, the Alliance de L'Avenir also included the PMSD, into which the PMXD, and its leader, Xavier-Luc Duval, had merged; seven of the sixty parliamentary candidates would come from the PMSD).

The Alliance de L'Avenir won 41 of the 60 directly elected seats. Ramgoolam remained Prime Minister and Pravind Jugnauth, son of Sir Anerood Jugnauth, became his Deputy. Following the involvement of some members of the MSM in the Medpoint Scandal, however, Ramgoolam dismissed the MSM from the government.

2014 elections

The general elections originally scheduled for 2015 were brought forward to December 2014. The Labour Party made a new alliance with the MMM, proposing a constitutional amendment to upgrade the Presidency to a less ceremonial role. Ramgoolam and Bérenger, the MMM leader, claimed that the election was a referendum on the proposal, which they called the Second Republic. If the alliance won more than 45 of the 60 directly elected mainland seats, the Constitution would be amended; Ramgoolam would run for the Presidency and Bérenger would succeed him as Prime Minister.

Ramgoolam and Berenger were opposed by the MSM-led Alliance Lepep, which also included the PMSD, which had been Ramgoolam's coalition partner, and a new party called Muvman Liberater, formed by a significant portion of ex-members of the MMM who were opposed to the idea of giving Ramgoolam more powers . The Alliance Lepep, which opposed the proposal for the Second Republic, won 47 seats out of 60. The Labour-MMM alliance won only 13 seats, 9 from the MMM and 4 from the Labour Party. Ramgoolam lost his seat for the first time in his political career. On 12 December 2014, he resigned as Prime Minister of Mauritius.+

Controversies

1978 arrest by British police
Navin Ramgoolam was arrested in the UK on 24 May 1978 in Wardour Street, Soho, London according to records of the Foreign Colonial Office (FCO). He was a student at University College London (UCL). British Police noticed Navin Ramgoolam driving dangerously as he committed a number of offences such as driving through a red traffic light, and performing an illegal u-turn where it was prohibited. Although he was not entitled to Diplomatic Immunity Navin Ramgoolam attempted to claim such protection after refusing to provide a breath specimen. When Navin Ramgoolam was subjected to a blood test the result was positive. As a result he was summoned for driving with excess alcohol in his blood, and was fined at Malborough Street Magistrate Court where he eventually pleaded guilty.

1997 Albion Gate Macarena Party
In March 1997 local residents of Albion village complained to the police about a noisy party held at a Labour Party political activist's bungalow. Several young women and even an under-age girl had been invited to the Macarena Private Party by the activist and they had to dance and undress to the tunes of Los Del Rio's song "Macarena". One woman escaped from the bungalow where former Prime Minister Navin Ramgoolam and his close associates former MP Iqbal Mallam-Hassam, Air Mauritius executive Nash Mallam-Hassam, and optician Farouk Hossen were also partying and drinking heavily. A few days later Ajay Daby, the lawyer who later represented the young women, brandished a black underwear at a public meeting, claiming that it belonged to a well known politician and that it had been recovered on Albion beach. Los Del Rio's song "Macarena" was subjected to a ban by the state's radio station MBC following Navin Ramgoolam's orders. Within three months the Labour-MMM coalition collapsed. The scandal was also known as Albion Gate and Affaire Macarena by the local press.

2010 verbal abuse of Nita Deerpalsing
On the public holiday of the 1st of May 2010 during a public meeting of the Labour-MMM coalition Alliance de l’Avenir in Quatre-Bornes Navin Ramgoolam became frustrated about a defective microphone. He soon lost his temper and abused the Director of Communication of the Labour Party (Mauritius) Kumaree Rajeshree Deerpalsing, also known as Nita Deerpalsing by yelling Li pas marsé ta putain (meaning "It does not work, you slut". The abuse was broadcast live by other radio stations which were covering the event and was reproduced several times on social media as an example of Navin Ramgoolam's lack of respect for women.

2014 London suitcase and Rolls-Royce RR10RAM
After claiming to be visiting London for the tenth time to discuss a legal matter with British counsel Phillipe Sands, Navin Ramgoolam was spotted in his chauffeur-driven Rolls-Royce bearing number plate RR10RAM as he carried a suitcase to a bank, where an attendant recognised and greeted him with "How are you Mr Banker?"

2014 Nandanee Soornack fleeing to Italy and daughter Xara Keiron Chandra 
Soon after the proclamation of the December 2014 general elections in Mauritius Nandanee Soornack (born Nandanee Oogarah), girlfriend and close associate of Navin Ramgoolam, fled to Italy with 12 suitcases. The former shop assistant and wife of a bus driver amassed substantial wealth and influence after becoming an activist of the Parti Travailliste and received preferential treatment in large government contracts, especially in the tourism sector and airport facilities. Investigations showed that a number of offshore companies and bank accounts had been set up in order to channel funds out of Mauritius. Investigators in Mauritius  attempted to deport her back to Mauritius. Nandanee Soornack attempted to silence newspapers Le Mauricien and La Sentinelle by applying  for a Gagging Order. She revealed that Navin Ramgoolam is the father of her daughter Xara Keiron Chandra who was born in 2009.

2015 arrest for conspiracy, money laundering & murder
In February 2015 Navin Ramgoolam was arrested for alleged conspiracy, money laundering and as part of a July 2011 robbery and murder case (Affaire Roches-Noires). Local police searched his home located at Riverwalk in Floréal and discovered safes and suitcases containing around $6.4 million in various foreign currencies, 9 exclusive American Express Black credit cards, as well as packets of Viagra sexual stimulant pills. He was later released and charges against him were dropped due to lack of sufficient evidence and the prosecution's delay in lodging the case.

Awards and decorations

:
 Grand Officer of the Order of Legion of Honour
:
Recipient of the Pravasi Bharatiya Samman (2008)
:
 Grand Commander of the Most Distinguished Order of the Star and Key of the Indian Ocean (2008)

Honours

Ramgoolam has received several accolades and honours. In 1998 he was made an Honorary Fellow of the London School of Economics and Political Science (LSE), Dr Honoris Causa by the University of Mauritius, Dr Honoris Causa from Aligarh Muslim University, India and Dr Honoris Causa by the Jawaharlal Nehru University, India in October 2005. Other awards he attained are the Grand Officier de la Legion d'Honneur from France in March 2006, the Honorary Freeman of Rodrigues from Rodrigues Regional Assembly in March 2007, The Wilberforce Medal from Wilberforce Lecture Trust, Hull, United Kingdom in June 2007, The Rajiv Gandhi Award from Mumbai Regional Congress Committee, India in August 2007, The Pravasi Bharatiya Samman Award from Government of the Republic of India in January 2008 as well as Grand Commander of the Order of the Star and Key of the Indian Ocean (GCSK) from the Government of the Republic of Mauritius in March 2008. In Paris, Ramgoolam received the Prix Louise Michel, awarded generally each year to a high personality in recognition of his or her outstanding contribution in the political field. He was made Doctor of Science (Honoris Causa) by the Padmashree Dr D. Y. Patil University, Mumbai, India in February 2009, Fellow of the Royal College of Physicians (FRCP) of the Royal College of Physicians, London in May 2009, Honorary Doctor by Staffordshire University, United Kingdom in July 2010, Order of the Rule of Law by the World Jurist Association, Bethesda, Maryland, USA in April 2011, Overseas Bencher by the Inner Temple, United Kingdom in April 2011 and Doctor of Laws (Honoris Causa) by the Kurukshetra University, Haryana, India in February 2012.

See also

 Veena Ramgoolam
 Sir Seewoosagur Ramgoolam
 Leader of the Opposition (Mauritius)
Bihari Mauritians

References

External links 

 
 
 

|-

1947 births
Alumni of the London School of Economics
Fellows of the Royal College of Physicians
Grand Commanders of the Order of the Star and Key of the Indian Ocean
Grand Officiers of the Légion d'honneur
Labour Party (Mauritius) politicians
Leaders of the Opposition (Mauritius)
Living people
Mauritian Hindus
Mauritian politicians of Indian descent
Members of the National Assembly (Mauritius)
Members of the Privy Council of the United Kingdom
Prime Ministers of Mauritius
Foreign Ministers of Mauritius
Ministers of Finance of Mauritius
Honorary Fellows of the London School of Economics
Children of national leaders
Recipients of Pravasi Bharatiya Samman